David Thomaz dos Santos Oliveira (born 14 October 2001), commonly known as David, is a Brazilian footballer who plays as a defender for Penafiel, on loan from Grêmio Anápolis.

Career statistics

Club

References

2001 births
Living people
Brazilian footballers
Brazilian expatriate footballers
Association football defenders
Liga Portugal 2 players
Grêmio Esportivo Anápolis players
F.C. Penafiel players
Brazilian expatriate sportspeople in Portugal
Expatriate footballers in Portugal